The Catalina 38 is an American sailboat that was designed by Sparkman & Stephens as a racer-cruiser and first built in 1978.

The Catalina 38 is a development of the Yankee 38.

Production
The design was built by Catalina Yachts in the United States. The company built 365 examples between 1978 and 1990, but it is now out of production.

Design
The boat was originally designed as Sparkman & Stephens design #2094-C2 for Yankee Yachts and produced as the Yankee 38, but that company only produced 30 examples between 1972 and 1975, before going out of business. Frank V. Butler purchased the molds and modified the design for production by his company, Catalina Yachts. The changes Butler incorporated included a new deck and cabin roof design, a taller rig and a balanced spade rudder, replacing the original skeg-mounted rudder.

The Catalina 38 is a recreational keelboat, built predominantly of fiberglass, with wood trim. It has a masthead sloop rig with aluminum spars, a raked stem, a raised counter reverse transom, an internally mounted spade-type rudder controlled by a wheel and a fixed fin standard draft or shoal draft keel. It displaces  and carries  of ballast.

The boat is fitted with a Universal Atomic 4  gasoline engine for docking and maneuvering.

The design has sleeping accommodation for five or six people. There is a bow cabin with a "V"-berth, two settee berths in the main cabin, including a "U"-shaped dinette settee and an optional quarter berth aft on the starboard side. The galley is "U"-shaped and is on the port side, at the foot of the companionway steps. It includes a two-burner stove, an icebox and a double sink, with a pressurized water supply. The navigation station is to starboard, opposite the galley. The head is forward on the port side and features a shower, with a teak grating. The cabin features oiled teak trim.

Ventilation is provided by a main cabin skylight and a bow cabin hatch.

There is an anchor locker in the forepeak. The halyards are hoisted by two winches on the cabin roof. There is a mainsheet traveler also mounted on the cabin roof. The genoa has sheet tracks on the bulwarks and primary winches in the cockpit.

The design has a PHRF Portsmouth Yardstick racing average handicap of 116.

Operational history
In a 1994 review Richard Sherwood wrote, "the Catalina [38] is available with either a standard or a shoal-draft keel. Entry is fine and rig tall, which should assist in going to weather. Maximum beam is amidships."

Michael Robertson, writing for Cruising World, in a 2014 review noted, "with its pedigree, it's no surprise that owners report the Catalina 38 sails to windward like it's on rails and also sails beautifully in light air. That superior upwind performance comes with a draft that approaches 7 feet, a limiting factor for some cruising sailors."

See also
List of sailing boat types

Related development
Yankee 38

Similar sailboats
Alajuela 38
C&C 38
Columbia 38
Eagle 38
Hunter 380
Hunter 386
Landfall 38
Sabre 38
Shannon 38

References

Keelboats
1970s sailboat type designs
Sailing yachts
Sailboat type designs by Sparkman and Stephens
Sailboat types built by Catalina Yachts